
Advisory circular (AC) refers to a type of publication offered by the Federal Aviation Administration (FAA) to provide guidance for compliance with airworthiness regulations, pilot certification, operational standards, training standards, and any other rules within the 14 CFR Aeronautics and Space Title. They define acceptable means, but not the only means, of accomplishing or showing compliance with airworthiness regulations.   Generally informative in nature, Advisory Circulars are neither binding nor regulatory; yet some have the effect of de facto standards or regulations.

Advisory circulars typically refer to industry standards from SAE (ARP) and RTCA (DO). With harmonization of technical content and guidance between EASA and the FAA, later advisory circulars also identify corresponding EUROCAE (ED) publications.  

Some advisory circulars are only a few pages long and do little more than reference a recommended standard; for example, AC 20-152 referencing DO-254. Others, like AC 20-115C/D, are considerably longer; in this case including guidance on how to transition from DO-178 revision B to C.

See also 
Airworthiness Directive (in comparison, airworthiness directives are legally enforceable rules)

References 

Avionics
Federal Aviation Administration